Jethabhai Ahir (born 1 June 1950) is an Indian politician and an MLA from Shehra. He was born in Aniyad and currently lives in Khodiyarna Muwada, Aniyad, Shahera, Panchmahal, Gujarat. Nowadays, he is associated with the Bharatiya Janata Party (BJP). He ran from Shehra constituency, in the Gujarat assembly elections in 2017 and he won the election by 100,383 votes. In the 2012 Gujarat legislative assembly elections, Jethabhai Bharwad won from this constituency with a majority of votes 28,725 over Takhtsinh Solanki, who was contesting for the Indian National Congress.

One criminal case has been registered against Jethabhai Ahir as of 2019.

Education 
He is a B.A graduate from Gujarat University in the year 2005 and completed first year in LLB and is into Farmer and Livestock Breeding.

References 

Gujarat politicians
1950 births
Living people
Gujarat MLAs 2012–2017
Gujarat MLAs 2017–2022